, also known as Ajima Manzō Chokuyen, was a Japanese mathematician of the Edo period.

His Dharma name was (祖眞院智算量空居士).

Work
Ajima is credited with introducing calculus into Japanese mathematics.  The significance of this innovation is diminished by a likelihood that he had access to European writings on the subject. Ajima also posed the question of inscribing three mutually tangent circles in a triangle; these circles are now known as Malfatti circles after the later work of Gian Francesco Malfatti, but two triangle centers derived from them, the Ajima–Malfatti points, are named after Ajima.

Ajima was an astronomer at the Shogun's Observatory (Bakufu Temmongaki).

Legacy
In 1976, the International Astronomical Union (IAU) honored Ajima by identifying a crater on the moon with his name. Naonobu is a small lunar impact crater located on the eastern Mare Fecunditatis, to the northwest of the prominent crater Langrenus.

Selected works
In a statistical overview derived from writings by and about Ajima Naonobu, OCLC/WorldCat encompasses roughly 20+ works in 30+ publications in two languages and 40+ library holdings.

   OCLC 017232052, collected works
   OCLC 057185881, algorithms considered
  (Introduction of the 'Works and Days Calendar''')
  (Ajima's Studies for Western Calendars)
  (Methods of Professor Ajima's '')
  (Introduction of Eclipses of the Sun and the Moon) 
  (Methods of Three Diagonals and Three Circles)
  (Periods of Decimal Fractions)

See also
 Sangaku, the custom of presenting mathematical problems, carved in wood tablets, to the public in shinto shrines
 Soroban, a Japanese abacus
 Japanese mathematics

Notes

References
 Endō Toshisada (1896). . Tōkyō: _.  OCLC 122770600
 Oya, Shin'ichi. (1970). "Ajima Naonobu" in Dictionary of Scientific Biography,'' Vol. 1. New York: Charles Scribner's Sons. 
 Restivo, Sal P. (1992).  Mathematics in Society and History: Sociological Inquiries. Dordrecht: Kluwer Academic Publishers. ;   OCLC 25709270
 Selin, Helaine. (1997).   Encyclopaedia of the History of Science, Technology, and Medicine in Non-Western Cultures. Dordrecht: Kluwer/Springer. ;   OCLC 186451909 
 David Eugene Smith and Yoshio Mikami. (1914).   A History of Japanese Mathematics. Chicago: Open Court Publishing.   OCLC 1515528 -- note alternate online, full-text copy at archive.org

1732 births
1798 deaths
18th-century Japanese mathematicians
Japanese writers of the Edo period
Japanese Buddhists